The Great Concert of Cecil Taylor is a live album by Cecil Taylor recorded in St. Paul de Vence, Nice, on July 29, 1969, and released on the Prestige label in 1977 as a 3-LP set. The album was originally released as Nuits de la Fondation Maeght on the French Shandar label as a box set, as three separate LPs in 1971. It features a performance by Taylor with Jimmy Lyons, Sam Rivers and Andrew Cyrille.

Reception
The AllMusic review by Scott Yanow refers to this recording as "a real blowout" and "a major release," and states: "The music is unrelentingly intense and Taylor does not let up for a moment.... listeners new to Taylor's music should investigate his solo piano works first."

Track listing
All compositions by Cecil Taylor.
 "Second Act Of A (Part 1)" - 21:17
 "Second Act Of A (Part 2)" - 20:51
 "Second Act Of A (Part 3)" - 18:08
 "Second Act Of A (Part 4)" - 16:11
 "Second Act Of A (Part 5)" - 12:45
 "Second Act Of A (Part 6)" - 20:38
Recorded in St. Paul de Vence, Nice, on July 29, 1969

Personnel
Cecil Taylor: piano
Jimmy Lyons: alto saxophone
Sam Rivers: soprano saxophone, tenor saxophone
Andrew Cyrille: drums

References

1977 live albums
Cecil Taylor live albums
Prestige Records live albums